The Academy Award for Best Assistant Director was awarded from 1933 through 1937. In the first year of this award, it referred to no specific film.

 1933:
Charles Barton (Paramount) - winner
Scott Beal (Universal) - winner
Charles Dorian (M-G-M) - winner
Fred Fox (United Artists) - winner
Gordon Hollingshead (Warner Bros.) - winner
Dewey Starkey (RKO Radio) - winner
William Tummel (Fox) - winner
Al Alleborn (Warner Bros.) - nominee
Sid Brod (Paramount) - nominee
Orville O. Dull (M-G-M) - nominee
Percy Ikerd (Fox) - nominee
Arthur Jacobson (Paramount) - nominee
Edward Killy (RKO Radio) - nominee
Joseph A. McDonough (Universal) - nominee
William J. Reiter (Universal) - nominee
Frank X. Shaw (Warner Bros.) - nominee
Ben Silvey (UA) - nominee
John Waters (M-G-M) - nominee
 1934: John Waters – Viva Villa! 
 Scott Beal – Imitation of Life
 Cullen Tate – Cleopatra
 1935: Clem Beauchamp and Paul Wing – The Lives of a Bengal Lancer
 Joseph Newman – David Copperfield
 Eric Stacey – Les Misérables
 Sherry Shourds – A Midsummer Night's Dream (write in)
 1936: Jack Sullivan – The Charge of the Light Brigade
 Clem Beauchamp – The Last of the Mohicans
 William Cannon – Anthony Adverse
 Joseph Newman – San Francisco
 Eric G. Stacey – The Garden of Allah
 1937: Robert Webb – In Old Chicago
 C. C. Coleman, Jr. – Lost Horizon
 Russ Saunders – The Life of Emile Zola
 Eric Stacey – A Star Is Born
 Hal Walker – Souls at Sea

References

Retired Academy Awards